The Pneumocystidomycetes are a class of ascomycete fungi. It includes the single order Pneumocystidales, which contains the single monotypic family Pneumocystidaceae, which in turn contains the genus Pneumocystis, causative agent of Pneumocystis pneumonia.

Ascomycota
Fungus classes
Monotypic fungus taxa
Taxa described in 1997